The Louis Delhaize Group is a Belgian retail group established in 1875 by Louis Delhaize. The principal activity is the operation of food supermarkets and hypermarkets in Belgium, France, Luxembourg and Romania.

On February 23, 2022, Louis Delhaize Group announced the renovation of all Match and Smatch banners in Belgium, scheduled to take place between 2022 and 2025, and the phasing out of the banners in favor of Louis Delhaize for Smatch and Louis Delhaize Open Market for Match.

Structure

 Cora (hypermarket)
 Match (supermarket)
 Smatch (small size Match shops)
 Delitraiteur
 Dod France (Delitraiteur in France)
 Louis Delhaize, (grocery chain, dating back to 1875)

 Profi (supermarket / formerly hard-discount, sold in 2009, Romania and was closed in 2012, Hungary)
 Ecomax (hard-discount)
 Truffaut (garden)
 Houra.fr (online store)
 Animalis (animals)
 Cora Voyages (travel agency)

References 

Retail companies of Belgium
Companies based in Hainaut (province)
Retail companies established in 1850
Belgian brands
Multinational companies headquartered in Belgium